Zipfelbach may refer to:

Zipfelbach (Lindach), a river of Baden-Württemberg, Germany, tributary of the Lindach
Zipfelbach (Neckar), a river of Baden-Württemberg, Germany, tributary of the Neckar